Dominion 6.20 was a professional wrestling pay-per-view (PPV) event promoted by New Japan Pro-Wrestling (NJPW). The event took place on June 20, 2009, in Osaka, Osaka Prefecture, at the Osaka Prefectural Gymnasium. The event featured ten matches, two of which were contested for championships. Go Shiozaki and Takashi Sugiura from Pro Wrestling Noah took part in the event as outsiders. It was the first event under the Dominion name. The original promotional poster for the event created some controversy due to the usage of Nazi symbols.

Storylines
Dominion 6.20 featured ten professional wrestling matches that involved different wrestlers from pre-existing scripted feuds and storylines. Wrestlers portrayed villains, heroes, or less distinguishable characters in the scripted events that built tension and culminated in a wrestling match or series of matches.

Event
The event marked the culmination of a storyline rivalry between the fifth Black Tiger and the fourth Tiger Mask in a Mask vs. Mask match, where Tiger Mask was victorious. Post-match, Black Tiger was prevented from escaping by Koji Kanemoto, the former third Tiger Mask, and then unmasked by Tiger Mask, revealing veteran wrestler Tatsuhito Takaiwa. American promotion Total Nonstop Action Wrestling (TNA) representatives Team 3D (Brother Devon and Brother Ray) returned to NJPW at the event to successfully defend the IWGP Tag Team Championship against Giant Bernard and Karl Anderson. In the main event, Hiroshi Tanahashi recaptured the IWGP Heavyweight Championship from Manabu Nakanishi and was afterwards challenged by Takashi Sugiura, setting up his first title defense.

Results

References

External links
The official New Japan Pro-Wrestling website

2009
2009 in professional wrestling
June 2009 events in Japan
Professional wrestling in Osaka
2009 in Japan
Events in Osaka